Mississippi Highway 338 (MS 338) is a  east-west state Highway in Pontotoc County, Mississippi. It serves as a business loop of U.S. Route 278 (US 278)/MS 6 through the city of Pontotoc.

Route description

It heads east through farmland for a few miles to enter the city of Pontotoc along West Oxford Street. The highway travels through neighborhoods before becoming concurrent with MS 9 in a business district, with the road continuing past this intersection as Spur Street (unsigned MS 770). MS 9/MS 338 head northeast (still on West Oxford Street) through the business district, having intersections with MS 15 and MS 336 (Turnpike Road), before curving eastward to travel through some neighborhoods on the north side of downtown, where it has an intersection with MS 41 (North Main Street). Here, MS 9 splits off and heads north while MS 338 continues east along East Oxford Street. MS 338 travels through more neighborhoods before leaving Pontotoc and winding its way through hilly woodlands for a couple of miles to come to an end at an interchange with US 278/MS 6 near Trace State Park. The road continues past this interchange as Longview Road.

The entire length of Mississippi Highway 338 is a two-lane state highway located entirely in Pontotoc County.

History

MS 338 was designated and signed in 2007 when US 278/MS 6 was realigned onto the new northern bypass of Pontotoc, the Pontotoc Parkway, which until that time was signed as MS 76 (part of Corridor V of the Appalachian Development Highway System). MS 338 follows the old two-lane alignment of US 278/MS 6 through the city.

Major intersections

Original route

The original routing of MS 338 was a short-lived (between 1960 and 1962) state highway designation for Antioch Road in western Pontotoc County, Mississippi. The entire route (as it still is today) was a narrow two-lane highway.

References

External links

338
338
Transportation in Pontotoc County, Mississippi